Radio Stations in Honduras.

Colón

 HRAX Musiquera 89.3 MHz
 HRAY Stereo Miggy 90.5 MHz
 HRVV Radioactiva 92.1 MHz
 HRXH Radio Globo 93.3 MHz

Comayagua

Copán

 HRRH La Voz de Occidente 92.3 MHz
 HRAX Musiquera 100.3 MHz

Cortés

San Pedro Sula

Francisco Morazán

Tegucigalpa

Gracias a Dios

 HRLP Radio América 99.3 MHz

Intibucá

Islas de la Bahía

 HRSN Sun 107.1 MHz

La Paz

 Radio Marcala 90.3 MHz

Lempira

Ocotepeque

 HRAX Musiquera 100.3 MHz

Olancho

Santa Bárbara

Valle

Yoro
Cadena Radial del Centro 102.9 F.M.